Last Train from Gun Hill is a 1959 Western in VistaVision and Technicolor, directed by John Sturges. It stars Kirk Douglas, Anthony Quinn and Earl Holliman. Douglas and Holliman had previously appeared together in Sturges' Gunfight at the O.K. Corral (1957), which used much of the same crew.

Plot
Two old friends, Matt Morgan (Kirk Douglas) and Craig Belden (Anthony Quinn), now find themselves on opposite sides of the law. Belden, a rich cattle baron,  is the de facto ruler of the town of Gun Hill. Morgan is a U.S. Marshal living in another town with his Native American/Indian wife (played by Ziva Rodann) and young son, Petey.

Two young drunken cowboys rape and murder Morgan's wife while she is returning with their son from a visit to her father. The boy escapes on one of the killers' horses which bears a distinctive, fancy saddle.

Morgan sets off to find the killer. His one clue is the saddle, which he recognizes as belonging to Belden. Assuming it was stolen from his old friend, Morgan travels to the town of Gun Hill to pick up the trail, but once there he quickly realizes that Belden's son Rick (Earl Holliman) is the killer.

Belden refuses to turn over his son, forcing Morgan to go against the entire town. Morgan vows to capture Rick and get him on that night's last train from Gun Hill.

Morgan takes Rick prisoner, holding him at the hotel. Belden sends men to rescue his son, but Morgan manages to hold them off. In the meantime, Belden's former lover, Linda, (Carolyn Jones) decides to help Morgan. She sneaks a shotgun to his hotel room. The second rapist, Lee, sets fire to the hotel to flush out Morgan.

Morgan presses the shotgun to Rick's chin on the way to the train depot, threatening to pull the trigger if anyone attempts to stop him. Lee tries to kill Morgan but shoots Rick instead. Morgan then kills Lee with the shotgun. As the train prepares to leave, a devastated Belden confronts Morgan in a final showdown and is gunned down.

Cast

 Kirk Douglas as Marshal Matt Morgan
 Anthony Quinn as Craig Belden
 Carolyn Jones as Linda
 Earl Holliman as Rick Belden
 Brad Dexter as Beero
 Brian G. Hutton as Lee Smithers (as Brian Hutton)
 Ziva Rodann as Catherine Morgan
 Bing Russell as Skag
 Val Avery as Steve, Horseshoe Bartender
 Walter Sande as Sheriff Bartlett

Filming locations
The movie was filmed in and around Old Tucson Studios outside of Tucson, Arizona, Sonoita, Arizona, as well as at Paramount Studios and their back lot in Los Angeles, California.

Comic book adaptation
 Dell Four Color #1012 (July 1959)

See also
 List of American films of 1959

References

External links 

1959 Western (genre) films
1959 films
American Western (genre) films
Bryna Productions films
Films adapted into comics
Films directed by John Sturges
Films produced by Hal B. Wallis
Films scored by Dimitri Tiomkin
Films with screenplays by James Poe
Paramount Pictures films
United States Marshals Service in fiction
Revisionist Western (genre) films
1950s English-language films
1950s American films